Kadiatou Diourthe (born 1 July 1994) is a Malian footballer. She has been a member of the Mali women's national team.

International career
Diourthe capped for Mali at senior level during the 2014 Africa Women Cup of Nations qualification.

References

1994 births
Living people
Malian women's footballers
Mali women's international footballers
21st-century Malian people
Women's association footballers not categorized by position